Ali Parra (born 8 January 1962) is a Venezuelan former cyclist. He competed in the road race at the 1988 Summer Olympics.

References

1962 births
Living people
Venezuelan male cyclists
Olympic cyclists of Venezuela
Cyclists at the 1988 Summer Olympics
Place of birth missing (living people)